Kölleda is a Verwaltungsgemeinschaft ("collective municipality") in the district of Sömmerda, in Thuringia, Germany. The seat of the Verwaltungsgemeinschaft is in the town Kölleda, itself not part of the Verwaltungsgemeinschaft since January 2021.

The Verwaltungsgemeinschaft Kölleda consists of the following municipalities:
Großneuhausen 
Kleinneuhausen 
Ostramondra 
Rastenberg

References

Verwaltungsgemeinschaften in Thuringia